Angoulême is a railway station located in Angoulême, Charente, south-western France. The station was opened in 1852 and is located on the Paris–Bordeaux railway, Saintes-Angoulême railway and Limoges-Angoulême railway. The train services are operated by SNCF.

The station building is part of the former Collège Royal de la Marine, as testified by an enamel plaque in the booking hall.

Train services
The following services call at Angoulême:

High speed services (TGV) Paris - Tours - Poitiers - Bordeaux
High speed services (TGV) Lille - Aeroport CDG - Tours - Poitiers - Bordeaux
High speed services (TGV) (Freiburg (Breisgau)) - Strasbourg - Aeroport CDG - Tours - Poitiers - Bordeaux
Local services (TER Nouvelle-Aquitaine) Bordeaux - Libourne - Angoulême
Local services (TER Nouvelle-Aquitaine) Angoulême - Poitiers
Local services (TER Nouvelle-Aquitaine) La Rochelle - Rochefort - Saintes - Cognac - Angoulême
Local services (TER Nouvelle-Aquitaine) Royan - Saintes - Cognac - Angoulême
Local services (TER Nouvelle-Aquitaine) Angoulême - Limoges

Bus services

Angoulême - Barbezieux - Jonzac - Pons

References

Railway stations in Nouvelle-Aquitaine
Angoulême
Railway stations in France opened in 1852